Vice-Admiral George Mackenzie (died 1780) was a Royal Navy officer who served as Commander-in-Chief, The Nore from 1774 to 1775.

Naval career
Mackenzie became commanding officer of the frigate  in July 1745 and then of the frigate  in August 1745. Promoted to captain in January 1746, he commanded, successively, the frigate , the sixth-rate  and the fourth-rate  and saw action in the Louisbourg Expedition. He went on to command the fifth-rate  and saw action in the Raid on St Malo in June 1758, the invasion of Martinique in January 1759 and the invasion of Guadeloupe in spring 1759. After that he was given command of the fourth-rate  and took part in the siege of Havana in spring 1762. We went on to command the third-rate  and then the third rate . He became Commander-in-Chief Jamaica Station in August 1770 and then served as Commander-in-Chief, The Nore from January 1774 to 1775.

He was appointed Rear-Admiral of the Red in January 1778 and Vice-Admiral of the Blue in March 1779. His son, Thomas, also served as an admiral.

References

1780 deaths
Royal Navy vice admirals